Linda Binder is an American politician and a former Republican member of the Arizona Senate from Lake Havasu City, representing the 3rd Senate District. Binder served two terms in the state House, one in term the state Senate and as a member of the Lake Havasu City Council. She is the former Director of Mohave State Bank

Elections
 2002 Running for the State Senate in the newly redrawn 3rd District, Binder defeated Democrat Jacquie Jessie in the General election.

References 

Living people
Date of birth missing (living people)
Republican Party Arizona state senators
American people of English descent
Year of birth missing (living people)